"You" is a song by Swedish singer Pandora. It was released in February 2003 as the lead single from Pandora's ninth studio album 9 Lives (2003).

Pandora entered the song into the Melodifestivalen 2003, a song competition to determine the Swedish entrant into the Eurovision Song Contest. The song competed in the second semi-final on 22 February 2003, coming last.

Track listing
 "You" (Original Radio Version) - 3:00
 "You" (NeuroPlastic Alternative Mix) - 4:02
 "You" (NeuroPlastic Club Mix) - 7:35
 "You" (NeuroPlastic RubberDub) - 7:35

Chart performance

References 

2003 singles
2002 songs
Melodifestivalen songs of 2003
English-language Swedish songs
Pandora (singer) songs
Songs written by Christer Sandelin